Longinus is a 2004 Japanese action horror featurette directed by Ryuhei Kitamura.

Synopsis
A war rages on, its end unknown, covering the world in despair. At a military field hospital, a group of soldiers bring in one of their own, wounded by a large, vicious, bite-like wound, along with a large box. The soldiers are visibly shaken. Suddenly, an enigmatic man appears. As he starts to tell them the legend of the Lance of Longinus, their night of unimaginable terror begins.

Cast
 Atsushi Sakurai
 Kanae Uotani
 Yumi Kikuchi
 Minoru Matsumoto
 Taro Kanazawa
 Kazuhito Ohba
 Takehiro Katayama
 Shion Machida
 Hideo Sakaki
 Toshiyuki Kitami

External links

Reviews
Nippon Cinema

2004 films
Films directed by Ryuhei Kitamura